Graeme Donald Macdougall (born 25 January 1940) is a former Australian Rugby Union player who represented for the Wallabies twice.

Early life and rugby career
Macdougall was born in Sydney and attended Newington College (1953–1958). He played 63 first grade games with St George.

He played in his first Test match against Fiji in Brisbane. He toured South Africa in 1961–62 and played in the first Test at Johannesburg. He was at that time the youngest ever forward chosen to make a Wallaby tour. His brother Stuart was also an Australian rugby union representative player.

Rugby league career
In 1964, MacDougall turned to Rugby league and played for the Balmain Tigers. A knee injury cut short his career and restricted him to just two appearances for Balmain in 1964.

References

1940 births
Living people
Australian rugby union players
Rugby union locks
People educated at Newington College
Australia international rugby union players
MacDougall family
Rugby union players from Sydney